Jurica Pršir (born 29 May 2000) is a Croatian professional footballer who plays as an midfielder for Prva HNL side Gorica.

Club career 
Pršir joined Hajduk Split together with Dario Špikić from Dinamo Zagreb in the summer of 2018. After not receiving any chances to play for Hajduk's first team, Pršir signed with Gorica on 12 October 2020.

International career 
Pršir has been capped for various Croatian youth national teams.

References

External links
 

2000 births
Living people
Footballers from Zagreb
Association football midfielders
Croatian footballers
Croatia youth international footballers
Croatia under-21 international footballers
HNK Hajduk Split players
HNK Gorica players
First Football League (Croatia) players
Croatian Football League players